Galegos may refer to:

Galegos (Santa Maria), a parish in the municipality of Barcelos, Portugal
Galegos (São Martinho), a parish in the municipality of Barcelos, Portugal
Galegos (Penafiel), a parish in the municipality of Penafiel, Portugal
Galegos (Póvoa de Lanhoso), a parish in the municipality of Póvoa de Lanhoso, Portugal
The name for the Galician people in the Galician language

See also
 Galician (disambiguation)